Jean Elizabeth Coussins, Baroness Coussins,  (born 26 October 1950) is a British parliamentarian and an adviser on corporate responsibility.

Lady Coussins is a member of the Advertising Standards Authority, a member of the Better Regulation Commission, and was formerly Chief Executive of the Portman Group. She also served as the Vice-President of the Chartered Institute of Linguists.

Personal life
Jean Coussins was educated at Godolphin and Latymer School, London, and Newnham College, Cambridge, where she graduated with a degree in Modern and Medieval Languages in 1973. She married, in 1976, Roger J. Hamilton, with whom she has two children; their marriage was dissolved in 1985. Jean has one child with Trevor Carter.

Honours
In February, 2007, the House of Lords Appointments Commission recommended she should be conferred with a Life Peerage as a Crossbencher in Parliament; her title was gazetted as Baroness Coussins, of Whitehall Park in the London Borough of Islington on 23 March 2007. She has been conferred Honorary Fellowship of the Chartered Institute of Linguists and is a Fellow of the Royal Society of Arts.

In 2013, she was awarded the President's Medal by the British Academy.

Arms
Lady Coussins' coat of arms is blazoned as follows:

References

External links 
 Debrett's People of Today

Sources

1950 births
Living people
Alumni of Newnham College, Cambridge
People's peers
Crossbench life peers
Fellows of the Chartered Institute of Linguists
Recipients of the President's Medal (British Academy)
Life peeresses created by Elizabeth II